Zădăreni is a commune in Arad County, Romania, is situated in the northern part of the Vinga Plateau, along the Mureș valley. Its territory occupies 2145 hectares. It is composed of two villages: Bodrogu Nou (Újbodrog) and Zădăreni (situated at 8 km from Arad). These were part of Felnac Commune until 2004, when they were split off.

Population
According to the last census, the population of the commune counts 2323 inhabitants, out of which 96,6% are Romanians, 3,1% Ukrainians and 0,1% are of other or undeclared nationalities.

History
The traces of inhabitance in this place date back to the antiquity.
In the archaeological site called "Cartierul Nou" ("New Quarter") in Zădăreni a settlement from the Iron Age and a Roman necropolis have been found. Despite this fact, Zădăreni was first mentioned only in 1333 while Bodrogu Nou in 1828.

Economy
There are hydrocarbon reserves present.

Tourism
In Bodrogu Nou one can visit the Hodoș-Bodrog Monastery built in the 12th century. It has collections of icons from the 15-18th centuries, old books, manuscripts, silverware, Roman tools originating from the archaeological excavations effectuated in the monastery courtyard in 1976–77.

References

Communes in Arad County
Localities in Romanian Banat